Kluski (singular: klusek or kluska; from German Klöße) is a generic Polish name for all kinds of soft, mushy dumplings, usually without a filling. At times the word also refers to noodles and pasta as well, especially when they are served in soup. 

There are many different types of kluski, differing in basic ingredients and preparation method. Kluski are distinct from pierogi and stand-alone pasta dishes.

Varieties
 Kopytka ("little hooves") are prepared from mashed potatoes, flour, and eggs. They are similar to Italian gnocchi, differing mostly in shape, as they are supposed to resemble animal hooves.
 Kluski leniwe ("lazy dumplings") are sometimes called pierogi leniwe despite being a type of kluski rather than pierogi. They are made from fresh cheese (twaróg), flour, and eggs, and often sweetened with sugar. The name refers to easy and quick preparation from scratch, ideal for a "lazy" cook. The traditional shape is flat, cut diagonally into diamonds, with a slight check pattern on top. These are one of the few sweet varieties, especially when served to children, although there are savory recipes as well.
 Kluski śląskie ("Silesian dumplings") are round, flattened dumplings with the size ranging from 3 centimeters to 5 centimeters, made from mashed potatoes, potato flour, and eggs. Usually served with gravy, their distinctive feature is a small hole or dimple  in the middle. Kluski czarne ("black dumplings"), also known as kluski żelazne ("iron dumplings") or kluski szare ("gray dumplings"), is a variety of kluski śląskie popular in Upper Silesia. In addition to mashed potatoes and flour, grated potatoes are added to the dough, giving it a distinctive color. In regions where these are popular, both white and black dumplings are served at the same meal.
 Kluski lane ("poured noodles"), a very thin variety formed by pouring watery batter made from eggs and flour into boiling water or directly into soup.
 Kluski kładzione ("laid dumplings"), a variety made from eggs, milk and flour, formed into a crescent-shaped forms by scraping the thick dough with the tip of a tablespoon and then laying the chunk onto boiling water. Soda water is sometimes added to the dough.
 Pampuchy, also known as pyzy drożdżowe ("yeast pyzy"), kluski drożdżowe ("yeast dumplings"), kluski na parze ("steamed dumplings"), or regionally kluchy z łacha ("dumplings from a rag") or in Silesia buchty (not to be confused with a kind rolls of the same name), a variety popular mainly in Greater Poland, distantly related to Czech knedliky (from German Knödel). They differ from other varieties in being prepared from leavened, yeast dough and steamed rather than boiled. Often served with sweet toppings, such as melted butter and sugar, or a sauce from strawberries or plum powidła.
 Pyzy ziemniaczane ("potato pyzy"), the only variety of kluski with a filling, made from raw or mashed potatoes, flour and eggs. These are usually larger than other kluski, round, with either savory or sweet filling. When sweet, they are also called knedle, while savory ones vary wildly by the region and can be similar to Lithuanian cepelinai.
 Kluchy połom bite

See also 
 Knedle, a variety of sweet, stuffed dumplings
 Pierogi, a Polish variety of stuffed dumplings
 Klöße, a similar German dish
 Halušky, a similar dish popular in Central and Eastern Europe
 Gnocchi, a similar Italian dish
 Nokedli, a similar Hungarian dish

References 

Dumplings
Polish cuisine
Silesian cuisine